Sony Corporation of America (SONAM, also known as SCA), is the American arm of the Japanese conglomerate Sony Group Corporation.

SONAM, headquartered in New York City, manages the company's US-based businesses.

Sony's principal U.S. businesses include Sony Electronics, Sony Pictures Entertainment, Sony Interactive Entertainment and the Sony Music Group (divided in the Sony Music Entertainment and Sony Music Publishing).

It was reported in December 2016 by multiple news outlets that Sony was considering restructuring its U.S. operations by merging its television and film business, Sony Pictures Entertainment, with its gaming business, Sony Interactive Entertainment. According to the reports, such a restructuring would have placed Sony Pictures under Sony Interactive's then CEO, Andrew House, though he would not have assumed day-to-day operations of the film studio. According to one report, Sony was set to make a final decision on the possibility of the merger of the television, film and gaming businesses by the end of its fiscal year in March of the following year (2017). By January 2020, nothing had materialized.

Investments in the United States 
Sony Group Corporation has been investing in the United States since the 1960s. Sony has made significant investments in various industries and has established a strong presence in the American market.

One of Sony's most notable investments in the US is in the entertainment industry. Sony Pictures Entertainment, a subsidiary of Sony Corporation, is a major player in the American film and television industry. The company produces, finances, and distributes a wide variety of content, including feature films, television shows, and streaming content. Sony Pictures has produced many successful and critically acclaimed movies, such as the Spider-Man and Jumanji franchises, as well as television shows like Breaking Bad and The Blacklist.

In addition to the entertainment industry, Sony has also invested heavily in the gaming industry in the United States. Sony Interactive Entertainment, another subsidiary of Sony Corporation, is the company behind the PlayStation gaming console. The PlayStation has been a major player in the gaming market for decades and has consistently been one of the top-selling gaming consoles in the United States.

Sony has also made investments in the technology and electronics industries in the United States. The company has manufacturing facilities and research and development centers in various states across the country, where they produce a wide range of products, including televisions, cameras, and audio equipment.

Sony Corporation has made significant investments in the United States across multiple industries, including entertainment, gaming, technology, and electronics. The company's subsidiaries, such as Sony Pictures Entertainment and Sony Interactive Entertainment, have established a strong presence in the American market and have contributed to the growth of these industries. Sony's investments in the US have been successful and have helped to solidify the company's position as a major player in the global market. Sony is the tenth largest foreign direct investor in the United States, with investments worth more than $90 billion. In 2021, more than half of Sony Corporation's revenue came from companies based in the United States.

Spider-Man Film IP 
In 1999, Sony acquired the Intellectual property movie rights to Spider-Man from Marvel Entertainment for $7 million. The Spider-Man movie franchise has grossed more than $9.8 billion, making it the fifth highest-grossing movie franchise in history. In 2021, Spider-Man: No Way Home became the seventh highest-grossing movie of all time.

Sony Interactive Entertainment 
In 2016, Sony moved PlayStation, Sony's biggest brand by revenue, to the United States. The largest  acquisition by Sony Corporation was American video game company Bungie for $3.7 billion in 2022.  The PlayStation 4 was the most profitable console ever, selling over 117 million units, making it the fourth best-selling console of all time. God of War became one of the 50 best-selling games of all time, selling 23 million units.  Sony Interactive Entertainment's revenue was $25 billion in 2021. PS5 become Sony's fastest-selling and most profitable console ever.

Sony Pictures Entertainment 
On November 9, 1989, Sony entered the film industry by acquiring Columbia Pictures for $3.4 billion. Columbia Pictures is considered one of the "Big Five" major American film studios. In 2021, Sony Pictures Entertainment became the highest earning film production company in the United States.

Sony Music Entertainment 
On January 5, 1988, Sony entered the music industry by acquiring Sony Music (formerly CBS Records) for $2 Billion. With the $8.9 billion revenue in 2021, Sony Music Entertainment is the second largest of the "Big Three" record companies, behind Universal Music Group and followed by Warner Music Group.

List of American companies acquired and owned by Sony Corporation

List of American Companies founded by Sony Corporation

List of stakes owned by Sony Corporation in American Companies 
In 2022, Sony  announced that it will invest more than 1 billion in Epic Games. In total, Sony's total investment in Epic Games is worth 1.45 billion and they own 4.9% of Epic Games.

Subsidiaries 
Sony Electronics Inc.
Sony Entertainment Inc.
Sony Pictures Entertainment Inc.
Sony Pictures Entertainment Japan
Sony Pictures Motion Picture Group
Sony Pictures Home Entertainment Inc.
Sony Wonder
Sony Pictures Television Inc.
Sony Music Group
Sony Music Entertainment
Sony Music Publishing LLC
Sony Interactive Entertainment LLC
Sony DADC US Inc.
 Sony Mobile Communications (USA) Inc. (Sony Mobile Communications Inc.)
Sony Immersive Music Entertainment (Sony Corporation of America)

Others subsidiaries 
 Sony Plaza Public Arcade (New York City, New York)
 Sony Optical Archive (formerly Optical Archive, San Jose, California)
 Sony Biotechnology (formerly iCyt Mission Technology, Champaign, Illinois)
 Micronics, Inc. (Redmond, Washington)

References

External links
 Sony Corporation of America

1960 establishments in New York (state)
American companies established in 1960
America
Software companies based in New York City
American subsidiaries of foreign companies
Software companies of the United States